Crystle Lea Lightning (born February 5, 1981) is a Canadian-American film actress, musician, DJ, and hip-hop MC.

Early life
Lightning holds dual citizenship with the United States and Canada. She is the daughter of director and actress Georgina Lightning, and her brother is actor Cody Lightning. A First Nations Hobbema/Enoch Cree artist, Crystle began performing in Edmonton, Alberta, when she was 4 years old before her family relocated to Hollywood, California, when she was 9.

Film career
Lightning started acting in 1994 and has been in several films, with her most notable role portraying Lori Piestewa in Saving Jessica Lynch. She played the lead role of Jo in 3 Ninjas Knuckle Up (1995). Since then, she has been cast in a recurring role on the daytime NBC soap Days of Our Lives, played Chloe in 2005's American Pie Presents: Band Camp, BET's The Game (2006); and in Older Than America (2008) alongside Bradley Cooper. She also voiced Jen, the girlfriend of the game's protagonist, Tommy, in the 2006 video game Prey.

At the 9th Canadian Screen Awards in 2021, she won the award for Best Actress in a Drama Series for Trickster.

Music career
Lightning is also an electro house DJ. Inspired by a mix performed by DJ Lady Tribe at a local Los Angeles nightspot, Lightning sought a musical apprenticeship with Christi Mills, later partnering with her mentor to form a performance crew called Ladies of the House. They perform regularly at Los Angeles venues, as well as throughout the United States.

LightningCloud
Moving from the DJ booth to the center-stage mic, Lightning paired up with MC RedCloud to form the hip-hop group LightningCloud. The pair released their self-titled debut, LightningCloud, in 2012 with RedCloud's long-term musical collaborator, DJ Hydroe. Sam Slovik of L.A. Weekly called the group, "a near-earth object inventing new realms of the Electro-House-Hip-Hop revolution on the planet. Urban futurist[s], MC RedCloud and Crystle Lightning are L.A.'s subterranean Bonnie and Clyde." The Aboriginal Peoples Choice Music Awards (APCMA) honored the group with recognition for Best Hip Hop Album in November 2012. In 2013, LightningCloud won the "Who's Next: Battle for the Best" contest on Power 106. As winners, LightningCloud received a cash prize, a performance with Kendrick Lamar, and the honor of representing west coast hip hop against Hot 97's Brooklyn-based east coast representative, Radamiz, in a freestyle battle in Austin, Texas, on March 15, 2013. After winning that MC battle, LightningCloud received the opportunity to work with Timbaland in the recording studio.

Filmography

Film

Short film

Television

Video games

References

External links
 
 Official Website

1981 births
Cree people
First Nations actresses
Canadian emigrants to the United States
Living people
Actresses from Edmonton
Musicians from Edmonton
American female models
American film actresses
21st-century Canadian rappers
First Nations musicians
Canadian film actresses
20th-century Canadian actresses
21st-century Canadian actresses
20th-century First Nations people
21st-century First Nations people
Canadian women rappers
Canadian female models
People with acquired American citizenship
Best Actress in a Drama Series Canadian Screen Award winners
21st-century American women
21st-century women rappers